NA-272 (Kech-cum-Gwadar) was a constituency for the National Assembly of Pakistan.

Election 2002 

General elections were held on 10 Oct 2002. Zubaida Jalal Khan an Independent candidate won by 44,177 votes.

Election 2008 

General elections were held on 18 Feb 2008. Yaqoob Bizenjo of Balochistan National Party won by 61,655 votes.

Election 2013 

General elections were held on 11 May 2013. Sayed Essa Nori of Balochistan National Party won by 15,835 votes and became the member of National Assembly.

References

External links 
Election result's official website

NA-272
Abolished National Assembly Constituencies of Pakistan